Zlata Petrović (Злата Петровић; born 13 July 1962) is a Serbian Pop-folk singer. She was born in Šabac, Serbia, to a  Montenegrin father and a Romani mother. She had two children: Jovan Pejić and Miki Dudić. Her musical career started after her compulsory school with her mother Dragica, a former singer. She started performing in cafés and at weddings. She was married to Zoran Pejić "Peja", Serbian TV host in ZAM, and now Gold Music.

Discography
 1983 - Dođi da mi ruke greješ
 1984 - Ljubi me još malo
 1986 - Srce će ga prepoznati
 1987 - Ti si čovek za moju dušu
 1989 - Daj mi bože malo snage
 1991 - Poludelo srce
 1993 - Učinilo vreme svoje
 1994 - Mađije
 1995 - Nedelja
 1997 - Plači, moli
 2001 - Mirišeš na nju
 2004 - Zagušljivo
 2008 - Pola tri

References
Zlata Petrovic Profile at the Poznate Licnosti
Sabor Interview
BalkanMedia Interview

Yugoslav women singers
Singers from Belgrade
Serbian turbo-folk singers
Grand Production artists
Serbian people of Montenegrin descent
Serbian people of Romani descent
1962 births
Living people
20th-century Serbian women singers
21st-century Serbian women singers